Bruno Rogger (born January 19, 1959) is a retired Canadian-born Swiss professional ice hockey defenceman who played for HC Lugano in the National League A. He also represented the Swiss national team at the 1988 Winter Olympics.

References

External links

Living people
People from the Cariboo Regional District
Canadian expatriate ice hockey players in Switzerland
1959 births
Ice hockey people from British Columbia
Ice hockey players at the 1988 Winter Olympics
Olympic ice hockey players of Switzerland
HC Lugano players
Brandon Travellers players
Brandon Wheat Kings players
Swiss ice hockey defencemen
Naturalised citizens of Switzerland